Saint-Henri–Sainte-Anne is a provincial electoral district in the Montreal region of Quebec, Canada that elects members to the National Assembly of Quebec. It comprises all of the Le Sud-Ouest borough of Montreal.

It was created for the 1994 election from parts of Saint-Henri and Saint-Anne electoral districts.

In the change from the 2001 to the 2011 electoral map, it only went minor changes; gaining some territory from the Notre-Dame-de-Grâce electoral district, and a tiny amount of territory from the Westmount–Saint-Louis electoral district.

In the change from the 2011 to the 2017 electoral map, the riding lost all of its territory in the Ville-Marie borough to the riding of Westmount–Saint-Louis.

Members of the National Assembly

Election results

 

 

 
 
 

* Result compared to UFP

References

External links
Information
 Elections Quebec

Election results
 Election results (National Assembly)
 Election results (QuébecPolitique)

Maps
 2011 map (PDF)
 2001 map (Flash)
2001–2011 changes (Flash)
1992–2001 changes (Flash)
 Electoral map of Montreal region 
 Quebec electoral map, 2011 

Provincial electoral districts of Montreal
Quebec provincial electoral districts
Le Sud-Ouest
Ville-Marie, Montreal